Krishnanagar Uttar Assembly constituency is an assembly constituency in Nadia district in the Indian state of West Bengal.

Overview
As per orders of the Delimitation Commission, No. 83 Krishnanagar Uttar Assembly constituency is composed of the following: Krishnanagar municipality, and Bhandar Khola, Bhimpur, Asannagar, Dogachhi and Pora Gachha gram panchayats of Krishnanagar I community development block.

Krishnanagar Uttar Assembly constituency is part of No. 12 Krishnanagar (Lok Sabha constituency).

Members of Legislative Assembly

Election results

2021

2016

2011
In the 2011 election, Abani Mohan Joardar of Trinamool Congress defeated his nearest rival Subinay Ghosh of CPI(M).

 

.# Swing calculated on Congress+Trinamool Congress vote percentages taken together in 2006 for the Krishnanagar East. seat.

1977-2006
Till 2006, Krishnanagar had two Vidhan Sabha constituencies Krishnagar East and Krishnagar West.

Krishnagar East
In the 2006 state assembly elections, Subinay Ghosh of CPI(M) won the Krishnagar East assembly seat defeating his nearest rival Dr. Ramendranath Sarkar of Trinamool Congress. Contests in most years were multi cornered but only winners and runners are being mentioned. Shibdas Mukherjee, representing Trinamool Congress in 2001 and Congress in 1996 and 1991, defeated Radhanath Biswas of CPI(M) in 2001 and 1996, and Sadhan Chattopadhyay of CPI(M) in 1991. Sadhan Chattopadhyay of CPI(M) defeated Shibdas Mukherjee of Congress in 1987 and Kashikanta Maitra of Janata Party in 1982. Kashikanta Maitra of Janata Party defeated Sadhan Chattopadhyay of CPI(M) in 1977.

Krishnagar West
In the 2006 state assembly elections, Asoke Banerjee of CPI(M) won the Krishnagar West assembly seat defeating his nearest rival Ujjal Biswas of Trinamool Congress. Sunil Kumar Ghosh of CPI(M) defeated Ujjal Biswas of Trinamool Congress in 2001, Biswarup Mukherjee of Congress in 1996 and Ujjal Biswas of Congress in 1991. Amritendu Mukherjee of CPI(M) defeated Gouri Sankar Dutta of  Congress in 1987 and 1982, and Mohadeb Bhattacharya of Janata Party in 1977.

1967-1972

Krishnagar East
Kashi Kanta Maitra representing Congress won in 1972, contesting as an independent candidate won in 1971, and representing SSP won in 1969 and 1967.

Krishnagar West
Shibdas Mukherjee of Congress won in 1972. Amritendu Mukherjee of CPI(M) won in 1971, 1969 and 1967.

1951-1962 Krishnagar 
Kashi Kanta Maitra of PSP won the Krishnagar seat in 1962. Jagannath Majumdar of Congress won in 1957. In independent India's first election in 1951 Bejoy Lal Chattopadhyay of Congress won the Krishnagar seat.

References

Assembly constituencies of West Bengal
Politics of Nadia district
Krishnanagar